Sunja is a municipality in Croatia in the Sisak-Moslavina County.

Population
The municipality has a total population of 5,748 (census 2011), in the following settlements:

 Bestrma, population 86
 Bistrač, population 40
 Blinjska Greda, population 35
 Bobovac, population 330
 Brđani Cesta, population 135
 Brđani Kosa, population 103
 Crkveni Bok, population 117
 Čapljani, population 37
 Četvrtkovac, population 232
 Donja Letina, population 30
 Donji Hrastovac, population 217
 Drljača, population 277
 Gornja Letina, population 71
 Gradusa Posavska, population 89
 Greda Sunjska, population 366
 Ivanjski Bok, population 35
 Jasenovčani, population 41
 Kinjačka, population 213
 Kladari, population 7
 Kostreši Šaški, population 71
 Krivaj Sunjski, population 120
 Mala Gradusa, population 20
 Mala Paukova, population 39
 Novoselci, population 38
 Papići, population 56
 Petrinjci, population 183
 Pobrđani, population 22
 Radonja Luka, population 31
 Selišće Sunjsko, population 37
 Sjeverovac, population 33
 Slovinci, population 152
 Staza, population 220
 Strmen, population 135
 Sunja, population 1,412
 Šaš, population 307
 Timarci, population 119
 Vedro Polje, population 119
 Velika Gradusa, population 87
 Vukoševac, population 21
 Žreme, population 65

In the 2011 census, there were 4,264 (74.18%) Croats and 1,280 (22.27%) Serbs.

History

People lived in the area between the Sava and Sunja rivers even in prehistoric times. This is proven by the archaeological site on the hill called Pleće, where the remains of a former fishing settlement and pottery fragments were found. In the 4th century BC, Celts belonging to the "Segestani" tribe broke into the territory inhabited by the Illyrians. They founded the most important city in the region, Segestica, located northwest of here. The city was conquered by the Roman army led by Octavian in the i. e. He occupied it between 35 BC and 33 BC in his campaign against the Iapodes of the Eastern Alps during his conquest of Illyria. He then established a military camp opposite the Celtic city on the left bank of Kulpa, which he named Siscia. Two important Roman roads led from Siscia through the area of today's Sunja, one led to what was then Sirmium, the other to Salona.

The Slavs arrived in this region in the 7th century during Avar era. After demise of Avar rule, March of Pannonia was founded. After demise of this march, it was initially ruled by Franks. It was finally part of Kingdom of Croatia. After Coloman defeating Petar Snačić, the last Croatian king, Croatia entered a personal union with Kingdom of Hungary according to Pacta convent in 1102.

Sunja was conquered by Ottomans along with Kostajnica in 1556. The population fled from the constant fighting to the safer Western Hungary, mainly to the area of today's Burgenland, others were captured by the Turks. During Turkish rule Sunja was part of Greda nahiya in Bosnia Eyalet. Turkish rule lasted till Austrian conquest in 1687. It was part of Military Frontier till 1881 except French rule as part of Illyrian Provinces between 1809 and 1814.

In the late 19th and early 20th century, Sunja was part of the Zagreb County of the Kingdom of Croatia-Slavonia.

References

Populated places in Sisak-Moslavina County
Municipalities of Croatia